Vittore Gambello (1460–1537) was an Italian sculptor and medallist.

Gambello was born in Venice, and initially studied drawing under Giovanni Bellini.

He was first noted for his work with medals. Gambello was granted the title "Maestro della Stampe" at the Venetian Mint in 1484. Instead of using the established techniques of casting medals in sand or using the lost-wax process, he perfected a method for stamping medals in high relief. This led to the ability to get more detail and create larger production runs.
Some of his works reside at the Cleveland Museum of Art.

References

 

1460 births
1537 deaths
15th-century Italian sculptors
Italian male sculptors
16th-century Italian sculptors
Italian medallists